The Battle of Proctor's Creek -- also referred to as Drewry's Bluff or Fort Darling -- was fought from May 12 to May 16, 1864, in Chesterfield County, Virginia, during the Bermuda Hundred Campaign of the American Civil War. Proctor's Creek was named for Charles Proctor, who lived and farmed on the land surrounding most of the creek.

Battle

After his repulse at Swift Creek and Fort Clifton on May 9, Union Maj. Gen. Benjamin Butler withdrew into his entrenchments at Bermuda Hundred. A Confederate army of 18,000 was patched together under command of Gen. P.G.T. Beauregard to confront Butler's 30,000. On May 12, Butler moved north against the Confederate line at Drewry's Bluff, but again adopted a defensive posture when his attack was not supported by gunboats. On May 13, a Union column struck the right flank of the Confederate line at the Wooldridge House, carrying a line of works. Butler remained cautious, however, giving Beauregard time to concentrate his forces. On May 16 at dawn, Maj. Gen. Robert Ransom's Confederate division opened an attack on Butler's right flank, routing many units. Subsequent attacks lost direction in the fog, but the Federals were disorganized and demoralized. After severe fighting, Butler extricated himself from battle, withdrawing again to his Bermuda Hundred Line.

Aftermath
There were approximately 6,600 total casualties. This battle stopped Butler's offensive against Richmond. The battlefield is now part of the Richmond National Battlefield Park.

References

External links
 National Park Service battle description
 CWSAC Report Update
 United Daughters of the Confederacy 1931 Commemorative Marker

Bermuda Hundred campaign
Battles of the Eastern Theater of the American Civil War
Confederate victories of the American Civil War
Proctor's Creek
Conflicts in 1864
1864 in Virginia
Chesterfield County in the American Civil War
May 1864 events